Piemont may refer to:

 Piemont or Piedmont, a region of Italy
 Piemont-Liguria Ocean, a former piece of oceanic crust that is seen as part of the Tethys Ocean
 Nicolaas Piemont(1644–1709), Dutch Golden Age landscape painter

See also 
 Piemonte  (disambiguation)
 Piedmont  (disambiguation)